The Jama Masjid is a mosque in the Kalbadevi neighborhood, near Crawford Market in the South Mumbai region of Mumbai, India.

The Muslim community of Bombay possesses 89 mosques, of which 8 belong to the Bohras, 2 to the Khojas, one to the Mughals and the remainder to the Sunni Muslims.

History

In the eighteenth century, a large tank (water reservoir) was situated at this site in the midst of gardens and open land and belonged to a Konkani Muslim merchant trading in Goa and Calicut, who in about 1775, agreed to the erection of a mosque at this site on condition that the tank was preserved intact.

The construction started initially in 1775 with raising of foundations on the tank. Objections were raised by neighbours that delayed construction until 1778. More disputes arose with illegal construction activities to its west and south. Finally the erstwhile governor of Bombay, Sir Meadows Taylor decided in favour of the mosque authorities. The date of its completion (AD 1802)/(AH 1217) is derivable from the chronogram  Jahaz-i- Akhirat, "The ship of the world to come"  which contains an allusion to the fact that it was constructed on the tank.

A one-story building was therefore erected over the tank and formed the original nucleus of the present Jama Mosque. A  top floor was added with the munificence of a prominent konkani merchant Mohammad Ali Roghay in 1814.

Sat Tad Masjid was used as the Jama Mosque of Bombay (now Mumbai) from 1770 to 1802, when this to-be Jama Mosque was under construction.

Architecture
The Jama Mosque is a quadrangular structure of brick and stone, encircled by a ring of terrace roofed and double storeyed buildings, the ground floors of which are let out as shops. The chief or eastern gate of the mosque leads directly across an open courtyard to the ancient tank, which is now furnished with masonry steps and embankments, built in 1893, and contain about ten feet of water fed by springs at the bottom, that contains gold and silver fish and few turtles. This is used for ritual ablutions (wudu), however modern facilities are also available for this purpose.

From the depth of the tank rise sixteen black stone arches, constructed in 1874, which support the whole fabric of the mosque, the upper story being upheld by five rows of wooden pillars, each of which contains a receptacle for sacred books.

Administration

Spread across more than an acre, the two-storey quadrangular mosque at Janjikar Street is run by the Juma Masjid of Bombay trust. Built in 1775, it is home to a digitised library with rare manuscripts from as early as the 1890s. It is said to be one of the main mosques for Sunnis and is managed by the Konkani Muslims. It follows the Shafie (شافعى) madhab (school) to which most Konkni Muslims adhere to.

In accordance with a scheme framed by the high court in 1897, the management of its properties and affairs vests in a board of eleven directors, triennially elected by Konkani Muslim Jamat, while the executive functions are delegated to a Nazir, appointed by the board. The staff of the mosque includes am Imam or prayer leader, an assistant imam, a Bangi (muezzin) and assistant Bangi whose duty is to summon the devotees to prayer, and several subordinated.

Location

The Jama Masjid is located in Janjikar Street, Kalbadevi near 'Dhobi Talao' area, Mumbai 400003. To its west is Zaveri Bazar (the main jewellery market) and to its east lies Abdul Rehman Street. For bus journeys, use buses stopping at Mahatma Phule Market (old name Crawford Market).

References

http://jumamasjid.org/  (official website)
The Gazetteer of Bombay city and island, by S M Edwardes, originally printed in 1909, Times press.
https://www.mumbai77.com/city/2211/temples-churches/jama-masjid-muslim-mosque/
https://www.holidify.com/places/mumbai/jama-masjid-sightseeing-11777.html?amp=1

Mosques in Mumbai
Religious buildings and structures completed in 1802
Indo-Islamic architecture
Mumbai